The discography of Alkaline Trio, a Chicago-based punk rock band, consists of nine studio albums, three compilation albums, one split album, four EPs, one video album, sixteen singles, one demo, nine digital releases, and thirteen music videos. Alkaline Trio formed in 1996 with an initial lineup of Matt Skiba (guitar, lead vocals), Rob Doran (bass), and Glenn Porter (drums). This lineup released the band's demo tape and the 1997 single "Sundials" on Chicago record label Johann's Face Records, after which Doran left the band and was replaced by Dan Andriano. The group then signed to Asian Man Records and released their debut EP For Your Lungs Only and album Goddamnit in 1998. A second EP, I Lied My Face Off, followed in 1999 and resulted in their first music video, for the song "Goodbye Forever". In 2000 Asian Man released the band's second album, Maybe I'll Catch Fire, as well as the compilation album Alkaline Trio, collecting most of their previously released early material. Porter then left and was replaced by Mike Felumlee.

The band next moved to Vagrant Records, releasing From Here to Infirmary in 2001. It was their first album to reach the Billboard charts, reaching #199 on the Billboard 200 and #9 amongst independent albums. Its two singles, "Stupid Kid" and "Private Eye", both charted on the UK Singles Chart. Felumlee then left and Derek Grant became the band's new permanent drummer. A split EP with Hot Water Music was released in 2002 through Jade Tree. The band's fourth album, Good Mourning, was released in 2003 on Vagrant, reaching #1 on Billboard's Top Independent Albums chart and #20 on the Billboard 200. "We've Had Enough" and "All on Black" were released as singles from this album, the former becoming the band's first song to chart in the United States. A DVD titled Halloween at the Metro was released later that year as an installment of Kung Fu Films' The Show Must Go Off! series. In 2004 the band participated in the BYO Split Series by releasing a split album with One Man Army.

Alkaline Trio's fifth album, Crimson, was released in 2005 through Vagrant. It did not fare as well on the charts as Good Mourning, though its three singles, "Time to Waste", "Mercy Me", and "Burn", became the band's highest-charting singles in the United Kingdom. In 2007 Vagrant released Remains, a compilation album of B-sides, compilation and EP tracks, and live material. Alkaline Trio then moved to major label Epic Records for 2008's Agony & Irony, which charted higher on the Billboard charts than any of their previous releases. It also spawned their highest-charting single in "Help Me", which reached #14 on Modern Rock Tracks. 2010's This Addiction was released through the band's newly formed label Heart & Skull, in partnership with Epitaph Records. It became the highest-charting album of their career, reaching #11 on the Billboard 200 and #1 on the Rock, Independent, and Alternative Albums charts. Damnesia, followed in 2011, consisting of "semi-unplugged" versions of songs from their past releases as well as three new tracks. The band's eighth studio album, My Shame Is True, was released on April 2, 2013. Alkaline Trio is releasing their ninth studio album,  Is This Thing Cursed? , on August 31, 2018, through Epitaph and Heart & Skull. The first single for it entitled “Blackbird” was released on July 19, 2018.

Albums

Studio albums

Compilation albums

Split albums

Extended plays

Video albums

Demos

I All four tracks from the demo tape were reissued on the 2008 re-release of Goddamnit.

Singles

Digital releases

I Denotes Blood Pact exclusive releases.

Other appearances

I Denotes songs that were re-released on Alkaline Trio.

II Denotes songs that were re-released on Remains.

III Denotes songs that were re-released on Scraps.

Music videos

References

External links

 

Discography
Discographies of American artists
Punk rock group discographies